Loring is a surname and may refer to:

Charles Loring (judge) (1873–1961), American lawyer, judge and Chief Justice of the Minnesota Supreme Court 
Charles J. Loring Jr. (1918–1952), United States Air Force fighter pilot posthumously awarded the Medal of Honor
Charles M. Loring (1833–1922), American businessperson, miller, father of the Minneapolis park system
Edward G. Loring (1802–1890), American judge who ordered that two escaped slaves be returned to their masters
Ellis Gray Loring (1803–1858), American abolitionist lawyer
F. G. Loring (1869–1951), English naval officer, wireless expert and writer
Frederick Wadsworth Loring (1848–1871), American journalist, novelist and poet
Frances Loring (1887–1968), Canadian sculptor
George B. Loring, (1817–1891), Member of US House of Representatives for Massachusetts
Gloria Loring (born 1946), American singer, songwriter and actress
Henry Loring (died 1822), Archdeacon of Calcutta
John Loring (Royal Navy officer, died 1808)
John Loring (designer) (born 1939), American designer and author
John Wentworth Loring (1775–1852), Royal Navy admiral
Jorge Loring, 1st Marquis of Casa Loring (1822–1901), Spanish noble, politician and businessman, founder of the aircraft manufacturer Talleres Loring
Jorge Loring Martinez (1889–1936), Spanish aviation entrepreneur, grandson of the 1st Marquis of Casa Loring
Jorge Loring Miró (1921–2013), Spanish Jesuit priest and author, son of Jorge Loring Martinez
Joshua Loring (1716–1781), American commodore in British service and United Empire Loyalist
Lisa Loring (1958–2023), American actress
Nigel Loring (surgeon) (1896–1979), Apothecary to the British Royal Household
Rosamond B. Loring (1889–1950), author, bookbinder and creator, collector and historian of decorated papers
Teala Loring (1924–2008), American actress
Thomas Loring (died 1661), early colonial settler, ancestor of most Lorings in eastern Massachusetts and probably New England
William Loring (Royal Navy officer) (1811–1895), British admiral
William Wing Loring (1818–1886), American officer in the United States Army, Confederate States Army and Egyptian Army

See also
List of Marqueses de Casa Loring, which includes several nobles with the surname Loring